Leonas is a Lithuanian masculine given name and surname; often a diminutive of Leonardas, and a Lithuanianized form of "Leon".

Leonas was also a Greek and a Latin name.

Surname
Petras Leonas (1864–1938), Lithuanian attorney and politician
Silvestras Leonas (1894–1959), Lithuanian military officer and judge

Given name
Leonas, a Greek rhetorician and sophist. Mentor of the philosopher Proclus
Leonas Alesionka (born 1949), Lithuanian politician 
Leonas Apšega (born 1940), Lithuanian politician
Leonas Baltrūnas (1914–1993), Lithuanian basketball player and coach
Leonas Bistras (1890–1971), Lithuanian politician, journalist, translator, philosopher and professor
Leonas Juozapaitis (1901–1980), Lithuanian footballer 
Leonas Koganas (1894–1956), Lithuanian physician 
Leonas Milčius (born 1942), Lithuanian politician
Leonas Petrauskas (1919–1994), Lithuanian basketball player
Leonas Prapuolenis (1913–1972), Lithuanian public figure, commander and leader of the June Uprising of 1941 in Lithuania
Leonas Sapiega (1557–1633), Lithuanian nobleman and statesman

References

Lithuanian masculine given names
Lithuanian-language surnames